Skierniewice Voivodeship was a unit of administrative division and local government in Poland from 1975 to 1998, superseded by Łódź Voivodeship and Masovian Voivodeship. Its capital city was Skierniewice.

Major cities and towns (population in 1995)
 Skierniewice (47,900)
 Żyrardów (43,500)
 Sochaczew (39,700)
 Łowicz (31,500)

See also
 Voivodeships of Poland

Former voivodeships of Poland (1975–1998)
History of Łódź Voivodeship